Ben Long (born 21 August 1997) is a professional Australian rules footballer playing for the Gold Coast Suns in the Australian Football League (AFL).

Early life
Long was born in Darwin, Northern Territory into a family of Indigenous Australian descent (Anmatjerre, Malak-Malak & Tiwi). As a member of the Rioli-Long family he shares numerous relations with other notable footballers including dual Essendon premiership player and 1993 Norm Smith Medallist Michael Long (uncle), four-time Hawthorn premiership player and 2015 Norm Smith Medallist Cyril Rioli (cousin), three-time Richmond premiership player Daniel Rioli (nephew), 2018 West Coast premiership player Junior Rioli (cousin) and dual Adelaide AFLW premiership player Danielle Ponter (cousin). Ben grew up playing junior football for St Mary's in the NTFL and in 2014, at the age of 16, he accepted a scholarship to attend Melbourne Grammar. In 2016, he played in Footscray's VFL premiership winning team.

AFL career
Long was drafted by the St Kilda Football Club with their first selection and twenty-fifth overall in the 2016 national draft. He made his debut in the fourteen point win against  at Etihad Stadium in round four of the 2017 season. Long was nominated for the AFL Rising Star for his performance in the draw against  at Etihad Stadium in round five of the 2018 AFL season, during which he recorded fifteen disposals, eight tackles, four marks and a goal. In the final game of St Kilda's 2022 season, Long compiled a career-best performance against the Sydney Swans which included 27 disposals, 17 marks, 13 intercepts and one goal with a disposal efficiency of 96 per cent on his 25th birthday.

References

External links

1997 births
Living people
St Kilda Football Club players
St Mary's Football Club (NTFL) players
Australian rules footballers from the Northern Territory
Indigenous Australian players of Australian rules football
Northern Knights players
Sandringham Football Club players
Rioli family
People educated at Melbourne Grammar School